The Kaiwaka River is a river of New Zealand's Northland Region. For much of its length, it is a broad arm of the Otamatea River, as much an inlet of the Kaipara Harbour as a true river.

See also
List of rivers of New Zealand

References

Kaipara District
Rivers of the Northland Region
Rivers of New Zealand
Kaipara Harbour catchment